The Nancy Guided Light Transit or TVR was a guided bus system in Nancy, France. The system used Bombardier's TVR technology. The TVR replaced the trolleybus system in Nancy. The system was closed on 12 March 2023, and is to be replaced by conventional trolleybuses.

Vehicles
The system used rubber-tyred, three-section articulated vehicles. The vehicles used trolley poles to collect current from parallel overhead lines, and also ran independently without the central guide rail.

History

The system was implemented as a replacement for the trolleybus network. The system had problems with derailing vehicles, as well as heavy wear and tear of the pavement. In 2018, 12 vehicles from Caen were transferred to Nancy for use as spare parts donors.

Planned closure and replacement
The TVR system was planned to be replaced by a conventional low-floor tram system, however due to high costs and steep gradients the TVR will be replaced by trolleybuses.

See also
 Caen Guided Light Transit
 List of rubber-tyred tram systems
 List of town tramway systems in France
 Trams in France

References

External links

 Nouveau Tramway : l'essentiel du projet 

Nancy
Transport in Nancy, France